Fisch may refer to:

Fisch, Rhineland-Palatinate, a municipality in Trier-Saarburg, Germany
Fisch (surname), a German surname
Fisch, botanical identifier for Friedrich Ernst Ludwig von Fischer

See also
Fisch-Ton-Kan, a French operetta